Neaethus was a river falling into what is now the Gulf of Taranto, where the ships of the Greeks were burned by the women of Troy whom they had held captive.

References

Ancient Greek geography
Former rivers